The Center for Neighborhood Technology (CNT) is a non-profit organization, headquartered in Chicago, Illinois, which is committed to sustainable development and livable urban communities.

The organization was founded in 1978 by Scott Bernstein, Stanley Hallett, and Dr. John Martin. It has recently grown to include an office in San Francisco, California. CNT has been responsible for developing a variety of projects. It launched two non-profits to advance its mission; Elevate Energy, an organization that develops and implements initiatives to help consumers and communities control energy costs and reduce energy use; and I-GO, a membership-based car sharing organization that provides hourly rental of a fleet of cars located across Chicago and its surrounding suburbs.  It also created Wireless Community Networks, a wireless internet access project which uses a mesh network.  In addition, their Urban Practice Consulting offers a unique menu of tools and strategies which can be applied individually or collectively to urban development and redevelopment issues.

Leadership
Scott Bernstein is CNT's founder and President.  Kathryn Tholin was appointed CEO of CNT in September 2005, after serving as the interim CEO since February 2005. Stephen Perkins, Ph.D., who joined CNT in 1980, is CNT's Senior Vice President, and Jacky Grimshaw, who joined CNT in 1992, is CNT's Vice President for Policy, Transportation & Community Development.

A Creative and Effective Institution
CNT was recognized on April 28, 2009, as one of only eight organizations from around the world to receive the prestigious John D. and Catherine T. MacArthur Foundation Award for Creative and Effective Institutions. CNT received the award for its use of cutting-edge research to develop and implement transformative ideas for improving the quality of life in urban neighborhoods, including car sharing and energy audits. The award recognizes organizations that are "highly creative and effective, have made an extraordinary impact in their fields and are helping to address some of the world's most challenging problems."

Change begins at home: leading by example
In 2000, the Center for Neighborhood Technology renovated their offices to the highest standards of the LEED Green Building Rating System.  In December 2005, the building became the thirteenth building to receive a "Platinum" LEED ranking.

Climate
The Center for Neighborhood Technology has been conducting research and developing and testing innovative programs to use urban resources more efficiently for almost 30 years. These efforts inevitably relate to the growing concerns about reducing greenhouse gas emissions and slowing global warming.

CNT's research has shown that cities can be the most efficient places to live, with their lower per capita greenhouse gas emissions due to efficient land use and transportation alternatives. Because urban areas are compact and have extensive mass transit and communication networks, they offer the greatest opportunities to help solve the climate crisis by expanding and enhancing their existing strategies for reducing carbon emissions.

In September 2008, the City of Chicago released its Climate Action Plan, which describes the major effects climate change could have on the city and suggests ways to address those challenges.  CNT led the mitigation research team for the Chicago Climate Change Task Force that developed the report.

CNT is not merely working to promote change locally however; it also took part in developing the Presidential Climate Action Plan, a comprehensive and detailed plan to help the next President of the United States take action on global warming within the first 100 days of the new administration.

Energy
In 2000, Elevate Energy (formerly known as the Community Energy Cooperative) was created.  Elevate Energy's areas of focus include building performance and energy efficiency, real-time electricity pricing, climate change analysis, regional energy planning, and green building research and evaluation.

In June 2008, CNT launched the Illinois Smart Grid Initiative, a voluntary group of state and local government, as well as consumer, business, environmental and utility stakeholders that will collaborate to examine how consumers can benefit from a comprehensive overhaul and modernization of the power grid in Illinois.

CNT, in collaboration with the Community Investment Corporation, created the Cook County Energy Savers to provide owners of multi-family buildings with recommendations and solutions for energy efficiency. It is "a one-stop energy efficiency shop" that offers energy assessments, financing options for implementing energy recommendations, assistance with coordinating tax benefits, and annual reports on energy performance.  CNT published "Engaging as Partners in Energy Efficiency: Multifamily Housing and Utilities" in 2012, discussing how upgrades in multifamily buildings could save both building owners and residents up to a billion nationwide.

One of Elevate Energy's most recent projects is Power Smart Pricing, which allows users to pay the hourly, wholesale market price of electricity, and save money by timing their electricity usage to the hours when it is cheapest.

Water
CNT helps communities find solutions to problems stemming from deteriorating water infrastructure like unreliable service, rising water rates, and flooded neighborhoods.  In 2012, CNT launched the "Smart Water for Smart Regions" initiative, which includes new research, inventive solutions, and regional advocacy focused on water supply and stormwater in Illinois, Indiana, Michigan, Minnesota, New York, Ohio, Pennsylvania, and Wisconsin.  The initiative helps communities deliver water services to homes and business efficiently, effectively, and transparently, while sustaining water resources in the region.

Another issue CNT considers a priority is the handling of stormwater.  Its goals are to reduce flooding, cut stormwater treatment and energy costs, and protect rivers, lakes, and vital landscape.  In 2005, CNT developed a way to measure the effects of storm water management in an effort to promote green infrastructure that better handles storm water (i.e. rain gardens, porous pavement, green roofs, drainage swales).  The Green Values calculator allows developers, regulators or simple property owners "to assess the economic and hydrological impact of green vs. conventional storm water management."

Working with Hey and Associates, Inc., CNT published "Monitoring and Documenting the Performance of Stormwater Best Management Practices" in 2012, a report on a 2009-2010 project to monitor and document the performance of stormwater best management practices.  There were three components of the project:
 Conducting real-time monitoring on a bioswale and two patches of permeable concrete and documented the results;
 Developing and implementing an inventory of green infrastructure features throughout the 6-county Chicago Region;
 Selecting 15 rain gardens for infiltration testing and three of those for additional synthetic drawdown testing and documenting the results.

CNT published "The Value of Green Infrastructure: A Guide to Recognizing Its Economic, Environmental and Social Benefits" in January, 2011, a broad analysis that places an economic value on the numerous benefits provided by green infrastructure.  By publishing this, CNT has hoped to inform decision-makers and planners about the multiple benefits green infrastructure delivers to communities and to guide communities in valuing the benefits of potential green infrastructure investments.

In October, 2008, CNT collaborated with the Water Environment Federation (WEF) to organize the building of a rain garden in Pulaski Park.  Built by volunteers, the rain garden is just one example of how green infrastructure can be beautiful as well as beneficial.

CNT's "Recommendations for Integrated Water Resources Planning in Lake Zurich" provides objective, external analysis and recommendations to advise the Village of Lake Zurich on an integrated water resources plan.

Other Natural Resources
CNT's work with natural resources is concentrated on making the most of natural resources, and using them in an intelligent and sustainable way.  Areas of focus include developing tools to map and analyze the values of green infrastructure, researching and demonstrating stormwater best management practices (BMPs), and promoting changes in local, regional and national policy.

As a result of a 2000 Openlands conference on natural resource protection in the tri-state (Wisconsin, Illinois, and Indiana) area, and Openlands' inability to find a map of the green infrastructure for the three states, CNT launched the Natural Connections project.  A data archive for a 19-county region was created, allowing users to download most of the data collected on green infrastructure for those areas.  An interactive web mapping tool allows users to take this data and create customized maps of the region's green infrastructure.

Transportation & Community Development
CNT promotes research and action on understanding housing and transportation affordability, revitalizing and developing communities and public involvement in shaping policy.  Its work has led to the creation of the I-GO carsharing program, and a number of tools created to increase awareness of the importance of transportation planning and promote better mass transit.

CNT is a founder of the Surface Transportation Policy Partnership (STPP), which is a nationwide coalition working to promote smarter transportation choices, and CNT's own Jacky Grimshaw is the Chair of the STPP steering committee.

In 2003, CNT, along with Reconnecting America and Strategic Economics, launched the Center for Transit-Oriented Development (CTOD) to help bring transit-oriented development (TOD) to scale as a nationally recognized real estate product.

As part of their commitment to TOD, CNT helped form the Lake Street Coalition, which successfully fought to keep the 'L' station at Pulaski and Lake Streets open when the CTA threatened to close it in the early 1990s.  They then joined with another member of the Lake Street Coalition, Bethel New Life, in an effort to revitalize and rehabilitate the area surrounding the 'L' station; initiating a neighborhood planning process.  CNT has also signed agreements with two communities, Blue Island and Harvey, for a public planning project that draws community benefits from already existing but undervalued transit and freight assets in Cook County suburbs.

Housing + Transportation Affordability Index

In 2006, CNT began developing the Housing + Transportation Affordability Index to come up with a more realistic way of considering the affordability of an area's housing.  Conventional housing economics say that affordable housing should cost 30% of a household's income, but this fails to take transportation costs into account, which are often a household's second highest expenditure.  The Housing + Transportation Affordability Index maps neighborhoods based on their mean income and average housing and transportation costs, giving consumers an idea of the true affordability of housing in that area.

In 2008, the Housing + Transportation Affordability Index became available through an interactive look-up and mapping website, which measures the affordability of housing for 52 metropolitan areas.  In 2010, the H+T Index expanded to 337 metropolitan areas in the United States, providing support for more than 80% of the U.S. population.  By 2012, this figure had increased to more than 900 metropolitan areas and 89% of the population.  In 2012, CNT published "Safe, Decent and Affordable: Transportation Costs of Affordable Housing in the Chicago Region", which applies the HT Index to multifamily properties financed by the Illinois Housing Development Authority in Chicago.  The study reveals the average transportation costs in these locations.

CNT launched in 2010, an online application that uses the H+T Index to show users their H+T scores graphically on a map while giving average cost of transportation figures.  Since 2011, Abogo (a portmanteau of "abode" and "to go") has had a gas price feature, which allows users to see what effect rising gas prices will have on their monthly transportation prices.

In the March 18 and 19, 2009 Federal hearing on "Livable Communities, Transit Oriented Development, and Incorporating Green Building Practices into Federal Housing and Transportation Policy", CNT's work (some of it through CTOD) was cited several times in the testimonies of the U.S. Housing and Urban Development (HUD), Secretary, Shaun Donovan, and U.S. Department of Transportation (DOT) Secretary, Ray LaHood as they announced the creation of an interagency partnership to promote sustainable communities through coordinating housing and transportation policy and investments.

In February 2012, CNT published "Prospering in Place: Linking Jobs, Development, and Transit to Spur Chicago's Economy", a call to action restoring location efficiency and creating new jobs and economic vitality based on Chicago's unique assets and advantages.

Legacy projects

Wet cleaning
During the 1990s, with funding from the U.S. Environmental Protection Agency and others, CNT began a research project with the Greener Cleaner to develop and test the viability of wet cleaning technology.  Wet cleaning, in place of traditional dry cleaning methods, reduces and even eliminates the use of solvents that are hazardous both to workers and communities.  Working with industry trade associations and others, CNT staff were able to promote the use of wet cleaning and help create pollution prevention recognition and certification programs.

Wireless Community Networks (WCN)
WCN is a community wireless network project developed by the Center for Neighborhood Technology for the Chicago area. Started in 2002, WCN uses a mesh network to provide high-speed internet access to members of local communities. The project is part of a community economic development strategy, and seeks to narrow the digital divide by operating in underserved areas.

References

Environmental organizations based in Chicago
Non-profit organizations based in Chicago